The Preis der Winterkönigin is a Group 3 flat horse race in Germany open to two-year-old thoroughbred fillies. It is run at Baden-Baden over a distance of 1,600 metres (about 1 mile), and it is scheduled to take place each year in October.

The event was established in 1959, and it was originally held at Mülheim. It was introduced as a fillies' counterpart to the Preis des Winterfavoriten at Cologne. It was initially contested over 1,400 metres, and was extended to 1,600 metres in 1973.

For a period the Preis der Winterkönigin was classed at Listed level. It was given Group 3 status in 2001. The race was transferred to Baden-Baden in 2004.

Records
Leading jockey (5 wins):
 Terence Hellier – Martessa (1990), White on Red (1994), Sommernacht (1999), Sorrent (2004), Love Academy (2007)

Leading trainer (10 wins):
 Heinz Jentzsch – Brisanz (1961), Dolce Vita (1969), Toscarina (1972), Akita (1973), Istria (1979), Operette (1980), Opium (1981), La Colorada (1983), Schwarz-Grün (1984), Quebrada (1992)

Winners since 1980

Earlier winners
 1959: Ankerkette
 1960: Alisma
 1961: Brisanz
 1962: no race
 1963: Little Lady
 1964: Sturmwoge
 1965: no race

 1966: Roswitha
 1967: Ordinanz
 1968: Friedensbotschaft
 1969: Dolce Vita
 1970: Orpheline
 1971: Lady Arc
 1972: Toscarina

 1973: Akita
 1974: Ordinale
 1975: Eirene
 1976: Anserma
 1977: Plantage
 1978: Alaria
 1979: Istria

See also
 List of German flat horse races

References
 Racing Post:
 
 galopp-sieger.de – Preis der Winterkönigin (Mülheim).
 galopp-sieger.de – Preis der Winterkönigin (Baden-Baden).
 horseracingintfed.com – International Federation of Horseracing Authorities – Preis der Winterkönigin (2012).
 pedigreequery.com – Preis der Winterkönigin.

Flat horse races for two-year-old fillies
Horse races in Germany
Recurring sporting events established in 1959
1959 establishments in Germany